Plush is a textile having a cut nap or pile the same as fustian or velvet.

Plush may also refer to:

Places
Plush, Dorset, a village in Dorset, England, UK
Plush, Oregon, an unincorporated community in Lake County, Oregon, USA

People
Plush (musician) or Liam Hayes, American entertainer
Jeff Plush, U.S. sports official
Tony Plush (born 1980), alter ego of American baseball player Nyjer Morgan

Entertainment
"Plush" (song), by Stone Temple Pilots
Plush (film), a 2013 American film
Plush (soundtrack), a 2013 soundtrack album for the eponymous 2013 film, see Plush (film)#Soundtrack
Plush (novel), a 2013 movie tie-in novel by Kate Crash prequel to the eponymous 2013 film

Other uses
Plush toy, synonym for stuffed toy
Plush, an Australian furniture retailer owned by Fantastic Holdings
Plurisubharmonic function
Sithon nedymond, the plush, a butterfly in the family Lycaenidae

See also